Infinito may refer to:

 Infinito (Fresno album), a 2012 album
 Infinito (Cyro Baptista album), a 2009 album
 Infinito (Litfiba album), a 1999 album
 Infinito (festival), a sports festival in North-east India